The Ministry of Community Development, Youth and Sports (MCYS) was a ministry of the Government of Singapore tasked with building a "cohesive and resilient" society in Singapore.

On 1 November 2012, the MCYS was restructured and became the Ministry of Social and Family Development (MSF). Several portfolios such as Youth Development and Sports was shifted to a new Ministry, the Ministry of Culture, Community and Youth (MCCY).

Responsibilities

The MCYS pursues social engineering campaigns of varying effectiveness. However, it also tries to encourage widespread youth participation, constructive social activity such as sport and volunteerism. It also tries to encourage acceptance of individual differences among youth.

MCYS has produced various campaigns to address issues such as filial piety to parents and the falling birthrate. Its three-minute short film promoting filial piety, in using more subtle and indirect artistic techniques compared to previous decades' campaigns, found local critical success and won MediaCorp's Viewer's Choice gold award and caused the page "Filial Piety" to receive over 40,000 likes on Facebook.

The MCYS seeks to make Singaporeans "socially responsible individuals", create "inspired and committed Youth" and is a ministry explicitly devoted towards family values ("strong and stable families"). It also seeks to create a "caring and active community" and to promote healthy, sportful lifestyles. It wishes to promote integration of people with disabilities into wider society, and prevent "youths-at-risk" from falling into juvenile delinquency. It also tries to encourage seniors to practice "active aging".

National Campaigns

 "Filial Piety" in 2010
 "A Girl's Hope" in 2010
 "Beautifully Imperfect" in 2009
 "Family" in 2008
 "Excuses" in 2008

Ministers 

The Ministry was previously led by the Minister for Community Development, Youth and Sports, who was appointed as part of the Cabinet of Singapore.

References

External links
 
 Singapore Government Directory Interactive — Ministry of Community Development, Youth and Sports

2004 establishments in Singapore
2012 disestablishments in Singapore
Community
Ministries established in 2004
Ministries disestablished in 2012
Singapore
Singapore
Singapore